Frugone is a surname. Notable people with the surname include:

Jim Frugone (1897–1972), American football player
Marie Frugone (1889-1953), American journalist and Red Cross nurse
Pedro Frugone, Chilean musician

See also
Frugoni